Sandy is a 1918 American silent drama film directed by George Melford, and written by Alice Hegan Rice and Edith Kennedy. The film stars Jack Pickford, Louise Huff, James Neill, Edythe Chapman, Julia Faye, and George Beranger. The film was released on July 14, 1918, by Paramount Pictures.

Plot

Cast
Jack Pickford as Sandy Kilday
Louise Huff as Ruth Nelson
James Neill as Judge Hollis
Edythe Chapman as Mrs. Hollis
Julia Faye as Annette Fenton
George Beranger as Carter Nelson 
Raymond Hatton as Ricks Wilson
Clarence Geldart as Dr. Fenton
Louise Hutchinson as Aunt Nelson
Jennie Lee as Aunt Melvy
J. Parks Jones as Jimmy Reed
Don Likes as Sid Gray

Reception
Like many American films of the time, Sandy was subject to cuts by city and state film censorship boards. For example, the Chicago Board of Censors cut, in Reel 4, shooting through window and, in Reel 5, the intertitle "It's Sandy Kilday. We're going to hang him."

References

External links 
 

1918 films
1910s English-language films
Silent American drama films
1918 drama films
Paramount Pictures films
Films directed by George Melford
American black-and-white films
American silent feature films
Films based on works by Alice Hegan Rice
1910s American films